Aaron Bastani (born 1983/1984) is a British journalist and writer. He co-founded the left-wing media organisation Novara Media in 2011, and has hosted and co-hosted many of its podcasts and videos. After a 2014 video for the publication, he popularised the term "fully automated luxury communism", which describes a post-capitalist society in which automation greatly reduces the amount of labour humans need to do. He wrote a book in 2019, Fully Automated Luxury Communism, about the subject. Bastani has also written for The Guardian, London Review of Books, openDemocracy and Vice, and is known for his Twitter activity.

Early life and education

Aaron Bastani was born as Aaron Peters in Bournemouth to a single mother, who died in 2015. She was employed in cleaning, the service industry and social care, and voted for the Conservative Party. His Iranian father Mammad Bastani was made a British refugee during the Iranian Revolution. He took his father's name Bastani in 2014.

Bastani completed an undergraduate and master's degree at the University College London. At the Royal Holloway, University of London, Bastani completed a PhD titled Strike! Occupy! Retweet!: The Relationship Between Collective and Connective Action in Austerity Britain under the supervision of Andrew Chadwick. At weekends, he sold tomatoes while working on Novara Media projects. He held a significant role in the 2010 United Kingdom student protests against increased tuition fees as an activist and organiser. During protest attendances as research for his PhD, Bastani was arrested twice, leading to a six-month extension. After he used a bin to jam open an HSBC bank door at a 2011 protest, he was convicted of a public order offence and served a year's community service at Mind and as a leaf sweeper. He completed the PhD in 2015.

Career
Bastani has written for publications including The Guardian, London Review of Books, openDemocracy and Vice. Jane Merrick called Bastani a "non-journalist", but Bastani argued in 2015 that he is a journalist. The Quietus commented that he is known for "regularly engaging in Twitter jousts", and is regularly engaged in controversy over his views. In 2017, he tweeted a false claim about Labour's membership figures increasing by 150,000 that was widely repeated; Sam Burgon of the BBC suggested that the information could have originated from a typo by Richard Burgon, who tweeted the same claim shortly after Bastani. After speaking critically about the Remembrance poppy and Royal British Legion during 2018, Bastani was criticised in The Sun and by Labour MPs including Tom Watson, Nia Griffith and Kevan Jones.

Andy Beckett of The Guardian described Bastani in 2019 as "an effective but slippery broadcaster and online presence: always fluent and flexible, able to switch from fierce defence of Corbynism to cheekier updates on the busy British left's latest preoccupations". The Labour MP Jon Cruddas criticised Bastani, among other left-wing figures, in his 2021 book The Dignity of Labour, for prioritising an educated cosmopolitan youth over "workers". Prospects Andrew Fisher found Cruddas's account of Bastani's "technological determinism" to be mistaken. Bastani was criticised for sexism by Lucy Hall of HuffPost in 2019.

Novara Media

In 2011, Bastani co-founded Novara Media, a left-wing news outlet, with James Butler. They were introduced to each other by Laurie Penny in the tuition fee protests. Named after the Italian city central to The Working Class Goes to Heaven, Novara Media was initially an hour-long radio programme on Resonance FM. In its early years, the organisation produced short-form media that Bastani compared to BuzzFeed, but it branched out into long-form content. It experienced an increase in popularity under the Labour Party leadership of Jeremy Corbyn, whom it was positive towards. Novara Media interviewed Corbyn and other major Corbynist figures. However, it was critical of the party under its following leader, Keir Starmer. Bastani has run video and podcast series for Novara Media including IMO Bastani and The Bastani Factor. Along with Michael Walker, Bastani has co-hosted The Fix and TyskySour.

Fully automated luxury communism
Bastani has been credited with popularising the term "fully automated luxury communism" (FALC). Bastani first used it in a 2014 IMO Bastani video for Novara Media. He argued for public ownership of automation as a way to improve falling living conditions and wages. He later said that the concept is based on Karl Marx's Das Kapital and Grundrisse, and imagines a society with decentralised control over technologies that reduce the amount of human labour required. Universal basic income (UBI) can be a short-term step towards this goal. The concept has been compared to a 1930 essay by John Maynard Keynes, Economic Possibilities for Our Grandchildren, that predicted improving technology would lead to a 15-hour working week within a century. Hobson and Modi criticised FALC as a misunderstanding of economics and how technology relates to social orders, saying that it assumes a gendered notion of labour and ignores ecological factors. In The Wall Street Journal, Andy Kessler argued that the idea is "complete baloney" because it would "fail in real life" due to "productivity". Kessler saw government actions in the COVID-19 pandemic in the United States as "a version of partly automated luxury communism".

The phrase, and variant "fully automated luxury gay space communism", circulated online as a meme after Bastani's usage. In the essay Socialist Imaginaries and Queer Futures, Thomas Hobson and Kaajal Modi said that the phrase originated as a "tongue-in-cheek" phrase used by "London-based lefties". Beckett said that the phrase was characteristic of Bastani, as it is "attention-grabbing" and "armoured against attack with a sparkly coating of irony". Other leftist people and groups use similar phrases, such as the communist group Plan C's phrase "luxury for all".

Fully Automated Luxury Communism: A Manifesto

Bastani wrote a book named after the term, Fully Automated Luxury Communism: A Manifesto, published in 2019 by Verso Books. In it, he conceives of a Third Disruption that would see the overthrow of capitalism and effective use of solar power for energy and mineral-rich asteroids for resources. Bastani opposes capitalism for creating short-term incentives that lead to artificial shortages. With technological advancement, UBI and free public services could be achieved in an environmentally sustainable manner.

Personal life
Bastani left the Labour Party in February 2021.

In August 2021, Bastani married Charlotte Gerada in Malta. Gerada is a Labour councillor on Portsmouth City Council who was first elected in May 2021.

Whilst interviewing Jeremy Corbyn in September 2022, Bastani briefly stated that he was a Catholic.

Selected publications

Books

News

Videos

References

1980s births
Living people
21st-century British people
British communists
British people of Iranian descent
Left-wing politics in the United Kingdom
Novara Media
Year of birth missing (living people)